Jarosite is a basic hydrous sulfate of potassium and ferric iron (Fe-III) with a chemical formula of KFe3(SO4)2(OH)6. This sulfate mineral is formed in ore deposits by the oxidation of iron sulfides. Jarosite is often produced as a byproduct during the purification and refining of zinc and is also commonly associated with acid mine drainage and acid sulfate soil environments.

Physical properties

Jarosite has a trigonal crystal structure and is brittle, with basal cleavage, a hardness of 2.5-3.5, and a specific gravity of 3.15-3.26. It is translucent to opaque with a vitreous to dull luster, and is colored dark yellow to yellowish-brown. It can sometimes be confused with limonite or goethite with which it commonly occurs in the gossan (oxidized cap over an ore body). Jarosite is an iron analogue of the potassium aluminium sulfate, alunite.

Solid solution series 

The alunite supergroup includes the alunite, jarosite, beudantite, crandallite and florencite subgroups.  The alunite supergroup minerals are isostructural with each other and substitution between them occurs, resulting in several solid solution series.  The alunite supergroup has the general formula AB3(TO4)2(OH)6. In the alunite subgroup B is Al, and in the jarosite subgroup B is Fe3+.  The beudantite subgroup has the general formula AB3(XO4)(SO4)(OH)6, the crandallite subgroup AB3(TO4)2(OH)5•H2O and the florencite subgroup AB3(TO4)2(OH)5 or 6.

In the jarosite-alunite series Al may substitute for Fe and a complete solid solution series between jarosite and alunite, KAl3(SO4)2(OH)6, probably exists, but intermediate members are rare. The material from Kopec, Czech Republic, has about equal Fe and Al, but the amount of Al in jarosite is usually small.

When jarosite forms from pyrite oxidation in sedimentary clays, the main sources of K+ are illite, a non-swelling clay, or K-feldspar. In other geological settings mica's alteration can also be a source of potassium.

In the jarosite-natrojarosite series Na substitutes for K to at least Na/K = 1:2.4 but the pure sodium end member NaFe3(SO4)2(OH)6 is not known in nature.  Minerals with Na > K are known as natrojarosite.  End member formation (jarosite and natrojarosite) is favoured by a low temperature environment, less than 100 °C, and is illustrated by the oscillatory zoning of jarosite and natrojarosite found in samples from the Apex Mine, Arizona, and Gold Hill, Utah.  This indicates that there is a wide miscibility gap between the two end members, and it is doubtful whether a complete series exists between jarosite and natrojarosite.

In hydroniumjarosite the hydronium ion H3O+ can also substitute for K+, with increased hydronium ion content causing a marked decrease in the lattice parameter c, although there is little change in a. Hydroniumjarosite will only form from alkali-deficient solutions, as alkali-rich jarosite forms preferentially.

Divalent cations may also substitute for the monovalent cation K+ in the A site.  Charge balance may be achieved in three ways.  
Firstly by replacing two monovalent cations by one divalent cation, and leaving an A site vacancy, as in plumbogummite, Pb2+Al3(PO4)2(OH)5.H2O, which is a member of the crandallite subgroup.
Secondly by incorporating divalent ions in the B sites, as in osarizawaite, Pb2+Cu2+Al2(SO4)2(OH)6, alunite subgroup, and beaverite, Pb2+Cu2+(Fe3+,Al)2(SO4)2(OH)6, jarosite subgroup.
Thirdly by replacing divalent anions with trivalent anions, as in beudantite, PbFe3+3(AsO4)3−(SO4)(OH)6, beudantite subgroup.

History 
Jarosite was first described in 1852 by August Breithaupt in the Barranco del Jaroso in the Sierra Almagrera (near Los Lobos, Cuevas del Almanzora, Almería, Spain). The name jarosite is also directly derived from Jara, the Spanish name of a yellow flower that belongs to the genus Cistus and grows in this sierra. The mineral and the flower have the same color.

Mysterious spheres of clay 1.5 to 5 inches in diameter and covered with jarosite have been found beneath the Temple of the Feathered Serpent an ancient six level stepped pyramid 30 miles from Mexico City.

Mars exploration 
Ferric sulfate and jarosite have been detected by three martian rovers: Spirit, Opportunity and Curiosity. These substances are indicative of strongly oxidizing conditions prevailing at the surface of Mars. In May 2009, the Spirit rover became stuck when it drove over a patch of soft ferric sulfate that had been hidden under a veneer of normal-looking soil.
Because iron sulfate has very little cohesion, the rover's wheels could not gain sufficient traction to pull the body of the rover out of the iron sulfate patch. Multiple techniques were attempted to extricate the rover, but the wheels eventually sank so deeply into the iron sulfate that the body of the rover came to rest on the Martian surface, preventing the wheels from exerting any force on the material below them. As the JPL team failed to recover the mobility of Spirit, it signified the end of the journey for the rover.

Antarctica deep borehole 
On Earth, jarosite is mainly associated with the ultimate stage of pyrite oxidation in clay environment and can also be found in mine tailings waste where acidic conditions prevail. Against all expectations, jarosite has also been fortuitously discovered in minute quantities in the form of small dust particules in ice cores recovered from a deep borehole in Antarctica. This surprising discovery was made by geologists who were searching for specific minerals capable to indicate ice age cycles within the layers of a 1620 meters-long ice core. Geologists speculate that jarosite dust could also have accumulated within ice on glaciers on Mars. However, this hypothesis is a matter of controverses, because on Mars jarosite deposits can be very thick (up to 10 meters); but Mars is also a very dusty planet and in the absence of plate tectonic on Mars glacial dust deposits might have accumulated during long periods of time.

Use in materials science 
Jarosite is also a more generic term denoting an extensive family of compounds of the form AM3(OH)6(SO4)2, where A+ = Na, K, Rb, NH4, H3O, Ag, Tl and M3+ = Fe, Cr, V. In condensed matter physics and materials science they are renowned for containing layers with kagome lattice structure, relating to geometrically frustrated magnets.

See also
 Alunite
 Iron(III) sulfate
 Spirit Mars rover final embedding event

References 

 Palache C., Berman H., and Frondel C. (1951) Dana's system of mineralogy, (7th edition), v. II, 560–562. 
 Webmineral data
 Cornell University (2004) How an obscure mineral provided a vital clue to Martian water.
 Discovery News (2013) "Robot Finds Mysterious Spheres in Ancient Temple"

External links
 Further information about the Jaros Hydrothermal system

Iron(III) minerals
Potassium minerals
Alunite group
Trigonal minerals
Minerals in space group 166